The  is a DC electric multiple unit (EMU) train operated by the private railway operator Shizuoka Railway in Shizuoka Prefecture, Japan, since 24 March 2016.

Design
The two-car EMU sets are built at J-TREC's Yokohama factory and based on the manufacturer's "Sustina" family of stainless steel-bodied trains. Seven of the 12 trains on order will be finished in different colour liveries, including "Clear Blue", "Elegant Blue", "Passion Red", "Pretty Pink", "Brilliant Orange Yellow", "Fresh Green", and "Natural Green". The other five sets will be finished in predominantly unpainted stainless steel, similar to the company's 1000 series trains.

Operations
A total of twelve two-car trains are scheduled to be introduced over a period of eight years, replacing the company's older 1000 series trains.

Formation
The two-car sets are formed as shown below, with one motored car and one non-powered trailer car. The motored "Mc" car is at the Shin-Shizuoka end.

The KuMoHa car is fitted with a single-arm pantograph.

Interior
Passenger accommodation consists of longitudinal bench seating throughout. Wheelchair spaces are provided in both cars.

History
In May 2017, the A3000 series was awarded the 2017 Laurel Prize, presented annually by the Japan Railfan Club.

Fleet details

References

External links

  

Electric multiple units of Japan
Train-related introductions in 2016
Rail transport in Shizuoka Prefecture
600 V DC multiple units
J-TREC multiple units